A , literally a "tea-drinking shop", is a Japanese-style tearoom that is also a coffee shop. They developed in the early 20th century as a distinction from a café, as cafés had become places also serving alcohol with noise and celebration. A kissaten was a quiet place to drink coffee and gathering places for writers and intellectuals.

In urban areas, people frequent kissaten for breakfast where they might have "morning service" of thick toast, boiled or fried eggs, a piece of ham or bacon, and a cup of tea or coffee.

There is also the modern phenomenon of the manga kissa, which is a version of the kissaten but with video games, manga and vending machines instead of coffee.

See also

 Manga cafe
 Cosplay restaurant
 Jazz kissa

References 

Japanese culture
Japanese popular culture
Types of coffeehouses and cafés
Restaurants by type
Restaurants in Japan